The 1979 Ghaenat earthquakes were a series of large earthquakes in Qaen County, Khorasan Province, northeast Iran, near the Afghanistan border. The first mainshock, known as the Korizan earthquake with a surface wave magnitude of 6.6 and moment magnitude of 6.8, struck on November 14, while the  7.1 or  7.2 Koli-Boniabad earthquake struck on November 27. The two mainshocks were assigned a maximum Modified Mercalli intensity of VIII (Severe) and X (Extreme), respectively. The earthquakes caused extensive damage throughout northeastern Iran, killing an estimated 297 to 440 people and left at least 279 injured.

Tectonic setting
Iran is situated within the Alpide belt, an active orogenic belt that spans the entire country. This tectonic environment is influenced by the oblique collision of the Arabian and Eurasian Plates at an estimated rate of 22 mm/yr. Iran itself is situated on the Eurasian Plate, where it hosts complex zones of faults, forming tectonic blocks within the country. In southeastern Iran, the Arabian Plate subducts beneath Iran along the Makran Trench. Shallow strike-slip and reverse faulting accommodate deformation in eastern Iran. Crustal shortening and thickening occur at fold and thrust belts along the Zagros, Alborz, and Kopet Dag ranges. Intraplate deformation occur, mainly displaying reverse faulting at the southern and northern parts of Iran to accommodate the convergence via crustal uplift, and strike-slip faulting at the east and western ends, where the Arabian Plate slides past the adjacent crust. The tectonic setting contributes to shallow seismicity.

Earthquakes
The earthquake of November 27 was the strongest in the area since 1968. Between 1968 and 1979, the area was hit by strong earthquakes including a 6.0 in 1976. Another large 6.7 or 6.5 shock on January 16, 1979, killing 200 people in the town of Bonzonabad. The source fault of that event has not been identified yet although the Boznabad and Pavak faults were possible candidates.

Korizan earthquake
The southern section of the earthquake surface rupture would move once again during the 1997 Qayen earthquake. The -long Abiz Fault ruptured in its entirety during the 7.1 earthquake of 1997. There were no prior recorded rupture before the 20th century.

Koli-Boniabad earthquake
The November 27 7.1 mainshock occurred as a result of strike-slip faulting for a length of  along the left-lateral Dasht-e-Bayaz Fault. It had an estimated moment magnitude of 7.1–7.2. The second rupture is nearly perpendicular to the prior rupture. The same fault produced another deadly 7.1 earthquake in 1968 to the west northwest. At least  of the 1968 rupture was involved in the 1979 event. The both earthquakes displayed strike-slip focal mechanisms.

The epicenter located at the eastern end of the surface rupture zone suggest the fault rupture propagated westward. The eastern end of the rupture was also the intersection point of the Abiz Fault's (source of the November 14 event) northern termination. During this mainshock, the northern termination of the November 14 event ruptured further northeast, joining the eastern section of the second rupture. It was involved in a 6.0 earthquake in 1936 which produced  of surface rupture.

Kalat-e-Shur earthquake
The earthquake has been suggested to be on a separate north–south striking structure, away from the Abiz Fault.

Impact
The earthquake damaged or destroyed mainly adobe-constructed buildings of the sun-dried clay type. Strong ground motion mainly of horizontal fashion caused many walls of these structures to completely detach from its roof, resulting in a collapse. More recent construction of single-storey buildings suffered small damage and were mostly intact. In one village located along a hill, the most serious damage was observed at the summit, and appear to decrease in severity downhill, suggesting the seismic waves produced by the earthquake was amplified and reflected at higher elevations on the hill. This subjected structures at the top of the hill with more intense shaking than those on lower elevations.

Between 280 and 420 people died, with a further 279 injured in the November 14 earthquake. Many villages were also badly damaged in the earthquake. The earthquake struck at 5:51 local time (IST) when many adult villagers were outside their homes harvesting saffron. Most of the dead were reportedly young children left at home while their adult family members were working in the saffron fields.

The second earthquake destroyed 10 villages. Survivors of the earthquakes were relocated to other areas while some damaged villages were rebuilt by the government in the same place. The second mainshock only resulted in 20 additional deaths and injured 24 people. The death toll from the second earthquake was smaller due to the low population density of the area when the quake struck.

See also
List of earthquakes in Iran
List of earthquakes in 1979

References

Ghaenat earthquakes
Ghaenat earthquakes
Ghaenat, 1979
Ghaenat earthquakes
History of South Khorasan Province
History of Khorasan
History of Razavi Khorasan Province
Earthquake clusters, swarms, and sequences
Ghaenat earthquakes